Antônio Carlos Mesquita (Itapecerica, state of Minas Gerais, October 13, 1923 - December 19, 2005) was a Brazilian bishop.

He was the second bishop of both the Roman Catholic Diocese of Oliveira and the Roman Catholic Diocese of São João del-Rei.

References 
Brazilian bishops
1923 births
2005 deaths

Catholic bishops in Brazil